Werner Ruzicka (born 26 December 1943) is a German boxer. He competed in the men's featherweight event at the 1968 Summer Olympics. At the 1968 Summer Olympics, he lost to Nils Dag Strømme of Norway.

References

1943 births
Living people
German male boxers
Olympic boxers of West Germany
Boxers at the 1968 Summer Olympics
People from Zlaté Hory
Sudeten German people
Featherweight boxers